ExpressJet Airlines Flight 2816 was a regional airline flight operated on August 8, 2009, as Continental Express Flight 2816, which resulted the stranding of its crew and 47 passengers for nearly 6 hours aboard the parked airplane at Rochester International Airport in Rochester, Minnesota.

Sequence of events 
The flight, operated by ExpressJet Airlines as a codeshare under the Continental Express brand, originated in Houston and was bound for Minneapolis–St. Paul.  As it neared its destination, thunderstorms forced its diversion to Rochester.  When the flight landed at 00:28 local time, the airport terminal had discontinued normal passenger services for the evening.  Because neither ExpressJet nor Continental maintained an operational presence in Rochester, Mesaba Airlines employees were the only ground handling staff on-site.

Despite initially agreeing to assist the diverted flight, Mesaba's Rochester station manager subsequently refused to grant permission for it to temporarily deplane its passengers into the terminal.  According to a post-incident report by the United States Department of Transportation (DOT) the Mesaba representative incorrectly cited Transportation Security Administration (TSA) regulations regarding afterhours security procedures, mistakenly believing that the passengers could not remain in a secure area and would be required to exit the facility entirely.

While the flight remained on the tarmac, Continental and ExpressJet managers attempted (but were unable) to arrange ground transportation to Minneapolis.  As a result, ExpressJet dispatchers decided to wait for better weather in an attempt to continue, rather than cancel, the flight.  To that end, the aircraft was refueled twice while passengers remained onboard and unable to deplane.  It was not until the crew had exceeded their maximum flight duty period that the operation was finally cancelled, and the aircraft was finally parked and allowed to deplane shortly after 06:00 local time.

Fallout 
The incident soon received widespread media coverage and resulted in federal investigations of the involved airlines for their roles in stranding the passengers.  The DOT ultimately charged Continental Airlines, ExpressJet airlines, and Mesaba Airlines each with violating Title 49 of the United States Code, § 41712, Unfair and deceptive practices and unfair methods of competition.  All three carriers opted to settle the matter through civil penalties, Continental and ExpressJet Airlines $50,000 each, and Mesaba Airlines receiving the largest fine of the three at $75,000.  This marked the first time the U.S. government had fined an airline for actions involved in a ground delay.

References

See also 
 Flight cancellation and delay
 FlyersRights.org

Transport reliability
Aviation law
Airline occurrences